Gran Idrettslag is a Norwegian multi-sports club from Gran, Oppland. It has sections for association football, volleyball, basketball, badminton, tennis, gymnastics, swimming, climbing, and Nordic skiing.

The club was founded on 10 June 1945. There had been two previous clubs, Gran UIL from 1933 and the AIF club Gran AIL, but Gran IL counts both of these as defunct before the foundation of Gran IL.

The men's football team plays in the 4. divisjon, the fifth tier of Norwegian football. It had stints in the 3. divisjon as late as 2010, 2014 and 2016, but were relegated on every occasion.

References

Official site
 Sparebank1banen - Nordic Stadiums

Football clubs in Norway
Sport in Oppland
Gran, Norway
1945 establishments in Norway
Association football clubs established in 1945